The Fellowship of the British Academy consists of world-leading scholars and researchers in the humanities and social sciences. A number of fellows are elected each year in July at the academy's annual general meeting.

Fellows elected by decade
 2020s
 2010s
 2000s
 1990s
 1980s
 1970s
 1960s
 1950s
 1940s
 1930s
 1920s
 1910s
 1900s

Types of fellows
 List of female fellows of the British Academy
 List of corresponding fellows of the British Academy
 List of honorary fellows of the British Academy

References

See also 

 Awards of the British Academy

 
 
British Academy